Matti Pulli (8 September 1933 – 24 September 2016) was a Finnish Olympic ski jumping coach. He coached the 1984 and 1988 gold medalist Matti Nykänen. In the biographical film Matti: Hell Is for Heroes, the character of Maisteri was based loosely on Pulli.

References 

1933 births
2016 deaths
Finnish athletics coaches
People from Zelenogorsk, Saint Petersburg
Finnish ski jumping coaches
20th-century Finnish people